Chatti is a surname found in Tunisia and Kuwait.

Chatti of Tunisia 
Chatti (or Chatty) of Tunisia is found mainly in Msaken.

Branches 
 Baya Chatti
 Zommitt Chatti
 Gregueb Chatti
 Baccouch Chatti
 Layouni Chatti

People 

 Habib Chatti
 Zoubeir Baya

Arabic-language surnames